The Downtown Mall in Charlottesville, Virginia is one of the longest pedestrian malls in the United States.  Located on Main Street, it runs from 6th St. N.E. to Old Preston Ave., where it extends to Water St., for total length of eight blocks. It is laid with brick and concrete, and home to an array of restaurants, shops, offices and art galleries.  On Fridays in the spring, summer and fall, the Downtown Mall is host to Fridays After 5, a weekly concert series.  Several side streets are also paved in brick and likewise closed to traffic.  On the east, the Mall ends at the Ting Pavilion, an outdoor concert venue, while the west end of the Mall features an Omni Hotel. It is also home to the newly renovated Paramount Theater and the historic Jefferson Theater.

History 
In 1976, East Main Street was converted into a pedestrian mall designed by landscape architect Lawrence Halprin.  In 2007, Charlottesville planned a comprehensive rehabilitation and renovation of the Downtown Mall.  Construction on the Mall Renovation began on Sunday, January 7, 2009 and was completed that summer. The 2017 Charlottesville car attack, in which a car was deliberately rammed into a crowd during a peaceful protest occurred on Market Street, only one block away from the Downtown Mall.

References

Further reading 
 "Downzone Mall: Developers not 'taken' with new plan", The Hook.
 "Mall renovations: Downtown businesses not reassured", The Hook.
 ""Fountainplus? Mall design includes lots more water", The Hook.

Buildings and structures in Charlottesville, Virginia
Pedestrian malls in the United States
Tourist attractions in Charlottesville, Virginia